George Gamble may refer to:

George Gamble (1877–1949), English cricketer
George Gamble (racing driver) (born 1996), British racing driver